Tami Ben-Ami (1955 – 22 July 1995) was an Israeli supermodel. She had a high-profile relationship with Aulcie Perry, an African American basketball player for Maccabi Tel Aviv B.C.

Ben-Ami died on 22 July 1995 at the age of 40 from cervical cancer.

References

1955 births
Israeli female models
1995 deaths